The Donnellan Lectures are a lecture series at Trinity College Dublin, instituted in 1794. The lectures were originally given under the auspices of the School of Hebrew, Biblical and Theological Studies. But since 1987 they have been run on a triennial basis by the Department of Philosophy and are no longer theological in nature. They were endowed from the estate of Anne Donnellan.

Lecturers (incomplete list)
1794 Thomas Elrington The Proof of Christianity… from the Miracles recorded in the New Testament 
1797, 1801. Richard Graves The Divine Origin of the Jewish Religion proved from the… Last Four Books of the Pentateuch
1807. Bartholomew Lloyd
1809  Richard Herbert Nash
1815–16. Franc Sadleir The Various Degrees of Religious Information Vouchsafed to Mankind 
1817. [Daniel Mooney D.D.]
1818. William Phelan Christianity provides… Correctives for… Tendencies to Polytheism and Idolatry
1821, 1824. J. Kennedy The Researches of Modern Science… demonstrate the Inspiration of… Scripture
1823 Franc Sadleir The Formulas of the Church of England Conformable to the Scriptures
1838 J. H. Todd The Prophecies Relating to Antichrist in… Daniel and St. Paul
1839 J. H. Todd The Prophecies Relating to Antichrist in the Apocalypse of St. John
1851 Mortimer O'Sullivan The Hour of the Redeemer 
1852 William Lee Inspiration of the Holy Scriptures
1853 W. de Burgh The Early Prophecies of a Redeemer 
1854 Charles Parsons Reichel The Nature and Offices of the Church 
1855 James Byrne Naturalism and Spiritualism
1855–56, 1859 J. MacIvor Religious Progress
1857 John Cotter MacDonnell The Doctrine of the Atonement deduced from Scripture 
1858. J. Wills The Antecedent Probability of the Christian Religion
1860 Atkins Pastoral Duties
1861 W. P Walsh Christian Missions 
1862  W. de Burgh Messianic Prophecies of Isaiah
1865 Ryder The Scripture Doctrine of Acceptance with God
1877 John Hewitt Jellett The efficacy of prayer
1878–9 George Alexander Chadwick Christ bearing witness to himself
1880–1 Charles H. H. Wright The Book of Koheleth, Commonly Called Ecclesiastes, Considered in Relation to Modern Criticism, and to the Doctrines of Modern Pessimism
1885–5 Mortimer O'Sullivan The Gospel in the Miracles of Christ, Man's Knowledge of Man and of God
1887–8 William Lefroy The Christian Ministry: Its Origin, Constitution, Nature and Work
1888–9 J. H. Kennedy Natural Theology and Modern Thought
 1889–90 Thomas Sterling Berry, DD Christianity and Buddhism : a comparison and a contrast
 1890 Frederick Falkiner Carmichael, LLD
 1891 Thomas Lucas Scott, MA
 1892 William Malcolm Foley, BD
 1893 Henry Francis John Martin, MA
 1894 Lewen Burton Weldon, DD
 1896 John Henry Bernard, DD
 1899 Charles Frederick D'Arcy Idealism and theology: a study of presuppositions

1900–2005
1900–1 G. R. Wynne The Church in Greater Britain 
1901–2 James Owen Hannay (ps. George A. Birmingham) Spirit and Origin of Christian Monasticism
1903–4 Rev. Frederick W. Macran
1906–7 H. J. Dunkinfield Astley Prehistoric Archaeology and The Old Testament
1911–2 Everard Digges La Touche The Person of Christ in Modern Thought 
1913–4 Charles Frederick D'Arcy God and Freedom in Human Experience
W. Boyd Carpenter The Witness of Religious Experience
Reginald Ingram Montgomery Hitchcock
1920 Joseph Armitage Robinson Barnabas, Hermas and the Didache
1921 A. A. Luce Bergson's Doctrine of Intuition
1922 Viscount Haldane 
1923 Reginald Arthur Percy Rogers  
1924 F. C. Burkitt The Religion of the Manichees
1929 C. D. Broad 
1930 John Scott Haldane The philosophical basis of biology
1931 Arthur Darby Nock
1936 H. Laski
1937 Arthur Salter 
1943 Edward John Moreton Drax Plunkett, Baron Dunsany
1944 T. E. Jessop
1945 Robert Ditchburn
1946 E. T. Whittaker Space and Spirit
1948 H. H. Price
1952 W. T. Stace 
1954 H. Frankel 
1989 Jerry Fodor
1992 Martha Nussbaum 
1995 Richard Sorabji
1998 Richard Rorty 
2002 Stanley Cavell
2005 Jonathan Lear
2008 Robert Pippin
2014 David Chalmers
2017 Susan Wolf

Notes

External links
TCD page

1794 establishments in Ireland
Christian theological lectures
Philosophy events
Trinity College Dublin
University of Dublin